General elections were held in Liechtenstein in April and May 1882.

Electors 
Electors were selected through elections that were held between 19 and 25 April. Each municipality had two electors for every 100 inhabitants.

Results 
The election of Oberland's Landtag members and substitutes was held on 2 May in Vaduz. Of Oberland's 114 electors, 105 were present. Oberland elected seven Landtag members and three substitutes. Electors from Schaan left the election in protest as no Landtag member had been elected from their municipality but the election continued.

The election of Unterland's Landtag members and substitutes was held on 3 May in Mauren. Of Unterland's 68 electors, 67 were present. Unterland elected five Landtag members and three substitutes.

Wendelin Erni and Wilhelm Schlegel were tied in the first ballot for the election of Oberland's Landtag members, but Schlegel did not accept his election. Johann Alois Schlegel and Franz Wolfinger did not also accept their election as Oberland's Landtag members. Rudolf Quaderer did not accept his election as Oberland's substitute. Ferdinand Walser was substituted in as a Landtag member for Oberland.

Franz Josef Kind did not accept his election as one of Unterland's substitutes.

References 

Liechtenstein
1882 in Liechtenstein
Elections in Liechtenstein
May 1882 events